The Division of Fraser is an Australian electoral division in the state of Victoria, which was contested for the first time at the 2019 federal election.

Geography
Federal electoral division boundaries in Australia are determined at redistributions by a redistribution committee appointed by the Australian Electoral Commission. Redistributions occur for the boundaries of divisions in a particular state, and they occur every seven years, or sooner if a state's representation entitlement changes or when divisions of a state are malapportioned.

History

The division is named in honour of Malcolm Fraser, who served as Prime Minister of Australia from 1975 to 1983. Fraser had represented the Victorian federal seat of Wannon from 1955 to 1983.

The division of Fraser was created in 2018 after the Australian Electoral Commission oversaw a mandatory redistribution of divisions in Victoria. Fraser was a new seat created to fill Victoria's allotment of 38 divisions, one higher than the number to which the state was previously entitled. The division was originally located in the outer north-west of metropolitan Melbourne and took in the suburbs of Sunshine, Albion, St Albans and Keilor Downs, among others. It was formed from parts of its neighbouring seats of Calwell, Gorton, Gellibrand and Maribyrnong.

In the 2021 redistribution, Fraser was significantly adjusted, moving towards the Middle and Inner West of Melbourne from the outer suburbs; losing the suburbs of Keilor Downs, Sydenham and several others north of Taylors Road and Green Gully Road to the Division of Gorton, swapping them for parts of Deer Park and Derrimut; and shifting east to acquire the Inner West suburbs of Footscray, West Footscray, Kingsville, Seddon and parts of Yarraville from the Division of Gellibrand, and gaining Maidstone and the suburb of Maribyrnong from the Division of Maribyrnong.

The seat was notionally held by the Labor Party on a margin of 20.6%, which made it a very safe seat for the party. It was duly won by Daniel Mulino for Labor in the 2019 federal election, albeit with a 5.61% swing against him. However, the 2021 Federal redistribution in Victoria has increased the notional margin for Labor to 18.1%.

Then-Opposition Leader Bill Shorten had reportedly considered moving to Fraser in the 2019 election but chose to remain in his current seat of Maribyrnong.

Members

Election results

References

External links
 Division of Fraser – Australian Electoral Commission
 Fraser Covered Suburbs - Australian Electoral Commission
 AEC Division of Fraser map, valid as of the 2021 redistribution; will be current for the 2022 Australian Federal Election.

Electoral divisions of Australia
Constituencies established in 2019
2019 establishments in Australia
2019 in Australian politics
City of Brimbank
City of Maribyrnong
Sunshine, Victoria
Electoral districts and divisions of Greater Melbourne